Portrait of Madame Oudiné is an oil-on-canvas painting by the French artist Hippolyte Flandrin, executed in 1840, now in the Musée des Beaux-Arts de Lyon.

History
It depicts the young wife of Eugène Oudiné, one of Flandrin's fellow painters at the Villa Medici. It was the first portrait Flandrin painted after his return from Rome and he produced it after a relatively short time lapse. It was very successfully exhibited at the Paris Salon of 1840.
The painting is interpreted as meant to symbolize bourgeois virtue as the pose of the woman appears devoid of life, very rigid and each element seems to highlight modesty and chastity, everything here being, according to Patrice Béghain, "nothing but order, stiffness and symmetry".

Description
The painting presents a woman seen from the front. Her brown hair is carefully ordered by a parting in the middle, while a red ribbon hangs from either side of her hairstyle. Her nose is straight, the lips tight, and she gazes towards the viewer very seriously. The woman is dressed in a black dress topped with a white lace wimple, leaving her shoulders bare, while a bouquet of violets is hanging in the middle of her chest. Around her neck shines a gold necklace ending with a emerald pendant and an eagle. The woman's hands are resting on top of each other on the ledge of a theater box, with a wedding ring highlighted adorning the ring finger of her left hand, while the other hand partially covers a theater bezel.

References

Sources
Patrice Béghain, Inconnues célèbres. Regards sur trente portraits du musée des Beaux-Arts de Lyon, Stéphane Bachès.

1840 paintings
Paintings by Hippolyte Flandrin
Oudiné
Oudiné
Paintings in the collection of the Museum of Fine Arts of Lyon